Stéphan Perreau (born 1969) is a French contemporary musician and art historian.

Biography 
A holder of a master's degree in art history and early modern period, Perreau studied at the University of Rouen, the Bordeaux Montaigne University and the University of Toulouse-Jean Jaurès. He is a specialist on painter Hyacinthe Rigaud to whom he devoted a monograph published in 2004.

A baroque flautiste and viol player, graduated from the Conservatory of Toulouse and the Conservatoire de Paris, he participated in the revival of the composer Joseph Bodin de Boismortier thanks to a close collaboration with Hervé Niquet, which led to a performance at the Opéra Comique of Don Quichotte chez La Duchesse, from a libretto by Favart. He devoted two recordings to Boismortier as well as a monograph, the first one about this composer, in 2002.

Principal publications 
 2001: Joseph Bodin de Boismortier (1689–1755), un musicien lorrain-catalan à la cour des Lumières, Les Presses du Languedoc, Montpellier, 240 p.
 2004: 
 2007: Jan Dismas Zelenka (1679–1745), Bleu Nuit éditeur, Paris, 176 p.
 2011: Alphonse Hippolyte Joseph Leveau, un représentant de l'académisme bourgeois, "Les Cahiers d'Histoire de l'art", n°9, Voulangis, (p. 77-87).
 2011: Un portrait de Claude Deshaies-Gendron au musée de Chantilly, "Bulletin des Amis du musée Condé"", n° 68. October, (p. 50-55).
 2012: Les années parisiennes de Jean Ranc, "L'Estampille-l'Objet d'art", n°475, January, (p. 38-47).
 2013: 

Stéphan Perreau is preparing publication of a catalog of the work of Jean Ranc.

Discography  
 Joseph Bodin de Boismortier: sonates à deux flûtes sans basse. Arion, ref. ARN63758.
 Pierre Danican Philidor: trois trios pour Hyacinthe Rigaud, Pierre Vérany, ref. PV700036.
 Joseph Bodin de Boismortier: variations en mineur pour flûte traversière seule. Pierre Vérany, ref. PV702111.

References

External links 

1969 births
Living people
French classical flautists
French viol players
21st-century French historians
French art historians
French biographers
Conservatoire de Paris alumni
University of Rouen Normandy alumni